Microchilo nugalis is a moth in the family Crambidae. It was described by Snellen in 1880. It is found on Sulawesi.

References

Diptychophorini
Moths described in 1880